The Exoporia are a group of primitive Lepidoptera comprising the superfamilies Mnesarchaeoidea and Hepialoidea. They are a natural group or clade. Exoporia is the sister group of the lepidopteran infraorder Heteroneura. They are characterised by their unique female reproductive system which has an external groove between the ostium bursae and the ovipore by which the sperm is transferred to the egg rather than having the mating and egg-laying parts of the abdomen with a common opening (cloaca) as in other nonditrysian moths, or with separate openings linked internally by a "ductus seminalis" as in the Ditrysia. See Kristensen (1999: 57) for other exoporian characteristics.

See also
Ditrysia
Heteroneura
Monotrysia

References

IV Arthropoda: Insecta Teilband / Part 35: 491 pp. Walter de Gruyter, Berlin, New York.

External links
Tree of Life
Mikko's Phylogeny Archive
 Abstract

 
Moth taxonomy
Insect infraorders
Neolepidoptera